In linear algebra, an orthogonal matrix, or orthonormal matrix, is a real square matrix whose columns and rows are orthonormal vectors.

One way to express this is

This leads to the equivalent characterization: a matrix  is orthogonal if its transpose is equal to its inverse:

The determinant of any orthogonal matrix is either +1 or −1. As a linear transformation, an orthogonal matrix preserves the inner product of vectors, and therefore acts as an isometry of Euclidean space, such as a rotation, reflection or rotoreflection. In other words, it is a unitary transformation.

The set of  orthogonal matrices, under multiplication, forms the group , known as the orthogonal group. The subgroup  consisting of orthogonal matrices with determinant +1 is called the special orthogonal group, and each of its elements is a special orthogonal matrix. As a linear transformation, every special orthogonal matrix acts as a rotation.

Overview
An orthogonal matrix is the real specialization of a unitary matrix, and thus always a normal matrix. Although we consider only real matrices here, the definition can be used for matrices with entries from any field. However, orthogonal matrices arise naturally from dot products, and for matrices of complex numbers that leads instead to the unitary requirement.

where  is an orthogonal matrix. To see the inner product connection, consider a vector  in an -dimensional real Euclidean space. If a linear transformation, in matrix form , preserves vector lengths, then

Thus finite-dimensional linear isometries—rotations, reflections, and their combinations—produce orthogonal matrices. The converse is also true: orthogonal matrices imply orthogonal transformations. However, linear algebra includes orthogonal transformations between spaces which may be neither finite-dimensional nor of the same dimension, and these have no orthogonal matrix equivalent.

Orthogonal matrices are important for a number of reasons, both theoretical and practical. For example, the point group of a molecule is a subgroup of O(3). Because floating point versions of orthogonal matrices have advantageous properties, they are key to many algorithms in numerical linear algebra, such as  decomposition. As another example, with appropriate normalization the discrete cosine transform (used in MP3 compression) is represented by an orthogonal matrix.

Examples
Below are a few examples of small orthogonal matrices and possible interpretations.
    (identity transformation)
    (rotation about the origin)
    (reflection across x-axis)
    (permutation of coordinate axes)

Elementary constructions

Lower dimensions
The simplest orthogonal matrices are the  matrices [1] and [−1], which we can interpret as the identity and a reflection of the real line across the origin.

The  matrices have the form

which orthogonality demands satisfy the three equations

 

The identity is also a permutation matrix.

A reflection is its own inverse, which implies that a reflection matrix is symmetric (equal to its transpose) as well as orthogonal. The product of two rotation matrices is a rotation matrix, and the product of two reflection matrices is also a rotation matrix.

Higher dimensions
Regardless of the dimension, it is always possible to classify orthogonal matrices as purely rotational or not, but for  matrices and larger the non-rotational matrices can be more complicated than reflections. For example,

represent an inversion through the origin and a rotoinversion, respectively, about the -axis.

Rotations become more complicated in higher dimensions; they can no longer be completely characterized by one angle, and may affect more than one planar subspace. It is common to describe a  rotation matrix in terms of an axis and angle, but this only works in three dimensions. Above three dimensions two or more angles are needed, each associated with a plane of rotation.

However, we have elementary building blocks for permutations, reflections, and rotations that apply in general.

Primitives
The most elementary permutation is a transposition, obtained from the identity matrix by exchanging two rows. Any  permutation matrix can be constructed as a product of no more than  transpositions.

A Householder reflection is constructed from a non-null vector  as

If  is a unit vector, then  suffices. A Householder reflection is typically used to simultaneously zero the lower part of a column. Any orthogonal matrix of size  can be constructed as a product of at most  such reflections.

A Givens rotation acts on a two-dimensional (planar) subspace spanned by two coordinate axes, rotating by a chosen angle. It is typically used to zero a single subdiagonal entry. Any rotation matrix of size  can be constructed as a product of at most  such rotations. In the case of  matrices, three such rotations suffice; and by fixing the sequence we can thus describe all  rotation matrices (though not uniquely) in terms of the three angles used, often called Euler angles.

A Jacobi rotation has the same form as a Givens rotation, but is used to zero both off-diagonal entries of a  symmetric submatrix.

Properties

Matrix properties
It might be tempting to suppose a matrix with orthogonal (not orthonormal) columns would be called an orthogonal matrix, but such matrices have no special interest and no special name; they only satisfy , with  a diagonal matrix.

The determinant of any orthogonal matrix is +1 or −1. This follows from basic facts about determinants, as follows:

The converse is not true; having a determinant of ±1 is no guarantee of orthogonality, even with orthogonal columns, as shown by the following counterexample.

With permutation matrices the determinant matches the signature, being +1 or −1 as the parity of the permutation is even or odd, for the determinant is an alternating function of the rows.

Stronger than the determinant restriction is the fact that an orthogonal matrix can always be diagonalized over the complex numbers to exhibit a full set of eigenvalues, all of which must have (complex) modulus 1.

Group properties
The inverse of every orthogonal matrix is again orthogonal, as is the matrix product of two orthogonal matrices. In fact, the set of all  orthogonal matrices satisfies all the axioms of a group.

Orthogonal matrices with determinant −1 do not include the identity, and so do not form a subgroup but only a coset; it is also (separately) connected. In practical terms, a comparable statement is that any orthogonal matrix can be produced by taking a rotation matrix and possibly negating one of its columns, as we saw with  matrices. If  is odd, then the semidirect product is in fact a direct product, and any orthogonal matrix can be produced by taking a rotation matrix and possibly negating all of its columns. This follows from the property of determinants that negating a column negates the determinant, and thus negating an odd (but not even) number of columns negates the determinant.

Now consider  orthogonal matrices with bottom right entry equal to 1. The remainder of the last column (and last row) must be zeros, and the product of any two such matrices has the same form.

Since an elementary reflection in the form of a Householder matrix can reduce any orthogonal matrix to this constrained form, a series of such reflections can bring any orthogonal matrix to the identity; thus an orthogonal group is a reflection group.

The bundle structure persists: . A single rotation can produce a zero in the first row of the last column, and series of  rotations will zero all but the last row of the last column of an  rotation matrix. Since the planes are fixed, each rotation has only one degree of freedom, its angle. By induction,  therefore has

degrees of freedom, and so does .

Permutation matrices are simpler still; they form, not a Lie group, but only a finite group, the order  symmetric group . The even permutations produce the subgroup of permutation matrices of determinant +1, the order  alternating group.

Canonical form
More broadly, the effect of any orthogonal matrix separates into independent actions on orthogonal two-dimensional subspaces. That is, if  is special orthogonal then one can always find an orthogonal matrix , a (rotational) change of basis, that brings  into block diagonal form:

where the matrices  are  rotation matrices, and with the remaining entries zero. Exceptionally, a rotation block may be diagonal, . Thus, negating one column if necessary, and noting that a  reflection diagonalizes to a +1 and −1, any orthogonal matrix can be brought to the form

The matrices  give conjugate pairs of eigenvalues lying on the unit circle in the complex plane; so this decomposition confirms that all eigenvalues have absolute value 1. If  is odd, there is at least one real eigenvalue, +1 or −1; for a  rotation, the eigenvector associated with +1 is the rotation axis.

Lie algebra
Differentiating the orthogonality condition

yields

Evaluation at  then implies

In Lie group terms, this means that the Lie algebra of an orthogonal matrix group consists of skew-symmetric matrices. Going the other direction, the matrix exponential of any skew-symmetric matrix is an orthogonal matrix (in fact, special orthogonal).

Numerical linear algebra

Benefits
Numerical analysis takes advantage of many of the properties of orthogonal matrices for numerical linear algebra, and they arise naturally. For example, it is often desirable to compute an orthonormal basis for a space, or an orthogonal change of bases; both take the form of orthogonal matrices. Having determinant ±1 and all eigenvalues of magnitude 1 is of great benefit for numeric stability. One implication is that the condition number is 1 (which is the minimum), so errors are not magnified when multiplying with an orthogonal matrix. Many algorithms use orthogonal matrices like Householder reflections and Givens rotations for this reason. It is also helpful that, not only is an orthogonal matrix invertible, but its inverse is available essentially free, by exchanging indices.

Permutations are essential to the success of many algorithms, including the workhorse Gaussian elimination with partial pivoting (where permutations do the pivoting). However, they rarely appear explicitly as matrices; their special form allows more efficient representation, such as a list of  indices.

Likewise, algorithms using Householder and Givens matrices typically use specialized methods of multiplication and storage. For example, a Givens rotation affects only two rows of a matrix it multiplies, changing a full multiplication of order  to a much more efficient order . When uses of these reflections and rotations introduce zeros in a matrix, the space vacated is enough to store sufficient data to reproduce the transform, and to do so robustly. (Following , we do not store a rotation angle, which is both expensive and badly behaved.)

Decompositions
A number of important matrix decompositions  involve orthogonal matrices, including especially:

 decomposition  ,  orthogonal,  upper triangular
Singular value decomposition  ,  and  orthogonal,  diagonal matrix
Eigendecomposition of a symmetric matrix (decomposition according to the spectral theorem)  ,  symmetric,  orthogonal,  diagonal
Polar decomposition  ,  orthogonal,  symmetric positive-semidefinite

Examples
Consider an overdetermined system of linear equations, as might occur with repeated measurements of a physical phenomenon to compensate for experimental errors.
A  decomposition reduces  to upper triangular . For example, if  is  then  has the form

In the case of a linear system which is underdetermined, or an otherwise non-invertible matrix, singular value decomposition (SVD) is equally useful.

The case of a square invertible matrix also holds interest. Suppose, for example, that  is a  rotation matrix which has been computed as the composition of numerous twists and turns. Floating point does not match the mathematical ideal of real numbers, so  has gradually lost its true orthogonality. A Gram–Schmidt process could orthogonalize the columns, but it is not the most reliable, nor the most efficient, nor the most invariant method. The polar decomposition factors a matrix into a pair, one of which is the unique closest orthogonal matrix to the given matrix, or one of the closest if the given matrix is singular. (Closeness can be measured by any matrix norm invariant under an orthogonal change of basis, such as the spectral norm or the Frobenius norm.)

For example, consider a non-orthogonal matrix for which the simple averaging algorithm takes seven steps

and which acceleration trims to two steps (with  = 0.353553, 0.565685).

Gram-Schmidt yields an inferior solution, shown by a Frobenius distance of 8.28659 instead of the minimum 8.12404.

Randomization
Some numerical applications, such as Monte Carlo methods and exploration of high-dimensional data spaces, require generation of uniformly distributed random orthogonal matrices. In this context, "uniform" is defined in terms of Haar measure, which essentially requires that the distribution not change if multiplied by any freely chosen orthogonal matrix. Orthogonalizing matrices with independent uniformly distributed random entries does not result in uniformly distributed orthogonal matrices, but the  decomposition of independent normally distributed random entries does, as long as the diagonal of  contains only positive entries .  replaced this with a more efficient idea that  later generalized as the "subgroup algorithm" (in which form it works just as well for permutations and rotations). To generate an  orthogonal matrix, take an  one and a uniformly distributed unit vector of dimension . Construct a Householder reflection from the vector, then apply it to the smaller matrix (embedded in the larger size with a 1 at the bottom right corner).

Nearest orthogonal matrix

The problem of finding the orthogonal matrix  nearest a given matrix  is related to the Orthogonal Procrustes problem. Another method expresses the  explicitly but requires the use of a matrix square root:

This may be combined with the Babylonian method for extracting the square root of a matrix to give a recurrence which converges to an orthogonal matrix quadratically:

where . 

Using a first-order approximation of the inverse and the same initialization results in the modified iteration:

Spin and pin
A subtle technical problem afflicts some uses of orthogonal matrices. Not only are the group components with determinant +1 and −1 not connected to each other, even the +1 component, is not simply connected (except for SO(1), which is trivial). Thus it is sometimes advantageous, or even necessary, to work with a covering group of SO(n), the spin group, . Likewise,  has covering groups, the pin groups, Pin(n).

The Pin and Spin groups are found within Clifford algebras, which themselves can be built from orthogonal matrices.

Rectangular matrices

The condition  says that the columns of Q are orthonormal.

There is no standard terminology for these matrices. They are variously called "semi-orthogonal matrices", "orthonormal matrices", "orthogonal matrices", and sometimes simply "matrices with orthonormal rows/columns".

For the case , matrices with orthonormal columns may be referred to as  orthogonal k-frames and they are elements of the Stiefel manifold.

See also
 Biorthogonal system

Notes

References

External links

 
 Tutorial and Interactive Program on Orthogonal Matrix

Matrices